Sin Bandera is a romantic ballads duo consisting of Mexican singer-songwriter Leonel Garcia and Argentine singer-songwriter Noel Schajris. They formed in Mexico in 2000.  They became one of the most popular artists after their debut album Sin Bandera was released on March 26, 2002.

Biography

2002-2002: Formation, self-titled album 
Leonel García (from Mexico) had the idea to be soloist, he showed dexterity with the guitar and his voice, but this project remained frozen at the record companies; meanwhile, García wrote songs for other recognized artists from the 1990s such as Lynda Thomas. At the same time, Noel Schajris (from Argentina, now a nationalized Mexican) was preparing another solo album after making his debut in 1999. Both being musicians, composers and singers, they discovered the ideal formula to unite their talents and personalities in 2000.

There was immediate chemistry: they spoke about their favorite music, of the albums they bought, and about the singer-songwriters they were most interested in, and coincided in everything. The two wanted to sing, but Noel preferred the piano, and Leonel, the guitar, for which at no time there was collision of interests, but an integration of musical inclinations.

They later began to write and record their self-titled debut album Sin Bandera, which touched the feelings of the romantic public in a special way with the production of the fellow musician Aureo Baqueiro. In their first meeting they wrote three songs, during a single day. Composing songs was the best way for them to get to know each other. After having separate musical experiences, it turned out to be very exciting to feel the force that they achieved together.

The name "Sin Bandera" (Without a Flag) was adopted to transmit the idea to worry about world union. They both thought that we lived in a separate society, that we get to the point where we no longer believe in ideology or in language, and we end up thinking that one is the enemy of the other. As love and music do not have a flag, from that they were inspired to name their new musical adventure. The duo wants to spread that message through the music; We are one and that feeling is the best route to communication; That love is the fundamental energy that gives sense to all.

"Entra En Mi Vida" ("Come Into My Life"), their first single, is a song written by themselves, in which they express the magic of love and the emotions that occur upon a first encounter with that special someone. It was also the main theme of the Mexican telenovela Cuando Seas Mía ("When You're Mine"). The singles "Kilómetros" ("Kilometres") and "Sirena" ("Mermaid") also became favorites among the young public. Their success extended to Spain, Argentina, and the United States, Costa Rica and many other countries around the world.

In 2002, Sin Bandera was nominated for a Latin Grammy award for "Best Group Album", which was awarded to them in Los Angeles, California on September 18. It received various ¡Oye! and Lo Nuestro (Best Pop Album) awards, and an MTV Latino award (for Best Artist).

2003-2004: De Viaje 
After a few restless months, in 2003, they recorded "Amor Real" ("Real Love"), which also served as the main theme for that homonymous soap opera. The duo was also responsible for opening concerts for Alejandro Sanz in the United States, and shortly after, in Spain.

By the end of 2003, their second album De Viaje (Traveling) arrived, produced again by Baqueiro, that likewise approached the millions of sales at international level, little by little. The album also remained for 16 continuous weeks in the lists of Billboard and its Hot Latin Tracks. Among the 16 tracks of the album there was "Que Lloro" ("I Cry"), "Mientes tan Bien" ("You Lie So Well"), "Amor Real", "Bien" ("Good"), "Magia" ("Magic"),  "Canción para días lluviosos" ("Song For Rainy Days") and "Puede ser" ("May Be"), which was a duet with Presuntos Implicados. Of these, the first 3 were number 1's in Mexico, an achievement only RBD and Shakira have managed to obtain.

In 2004 they carried out their tour to Venezuela, Bolivia, Argentina, Paraguay, Chile, Ecuador, Colombia, Mexico, the United States and Spain, among other countries. They were also nominated again for the fifth annual Latin Grammy awards, where they won the award for "Best Pop Vocal Group Album" for the second time around. After a successful gain as Better Pop Vocal Album by Duet or Group- by second consecutive year. Also, after a successful miniseason in Teatro Metropólitan of Mexico (3,300 spectators), they received the opportunity to play for the first time in the Auditorio Nacional of Mexico City (9,600 spectators) with two dates in the middle of October.

2005-2008: Mañana and Pasado 

Their album Mañana (Tomorrow), which was released on November 22, 2005, contains the single "Suelta mi mano" ("Let Go of My Hand"). This album also contains a soft atmosphere duet, "Como tú y como yo" ("Like You And Like Me"), sung with talented Italian pop singer Laura Pausini.

Their latest album, Pasado (Past), is a sequel to Mañana. This time, Sin Bandera teamed up with noted producers Áureo Baqueiro, Mario Domm and Jay de la Cueva. The emphasis this time is on international ballads of the 1970s and 1980s. Sin Bandera reworks the tunes with a slower, more soulful R&B touch.

The CD also includes De Vita's philosophical "Un buen perdedor" ("A Good Loser"); Sanz's anthemic and Beatlesque "¿Lo Ves?" ("Do You See it?"); and Montaner's lovely but haunting "Será?" ("Could it Be?"). Underwhelming is the pair's English-language rendition of "Love Is in the Air."

"These are the tunes which fascinated us when we were young adolescents," García said. "Tunes like 'Serenata Rap' ("Rap Serenade") and 'Mis Impulsos Sobre Ti' ("My Impulses About You") are the songs that move us (now)." 

Their greatest hits album, Hasta Ahora ('Til Now) was released on December 4, 2007, as an individual CD and in a special edition package which included a DVD of their commercially released music videos.

In 2007, the duo decided to split and start solo careers. They remain great friends and left open the possibility of reuniting.

2015-present: Reunion and Una Última Vez 

The duo's fifth studio album and first EP, Una Última Vez, was released on February 5, 2016.

In November 12, 2021, Sin Bandera released a single titled "Ahora Sé" ("Now I Know"), the duo plans to release a sixth album in 2022.

Discography

Studio albums

Compilations

Extended plays

Notes

References

External links
  Official Website

Mexican pop music groups
Musical groups from Mexico City
Latin Grammy Award winners
Musical groups established in 2000
Musical groups disestablished in 2008
Latin pop music groups